Mitchell College is a private college in New London, Connecticut. In Fall 2020 it had an enrollment of 572 students  and a faculty of 68. Admission rate was 70%. The college offers associate and bachelor's degrees in fourteen subjects.

Academics
Mitchell College reports having 23 full-time faculty, 73 part-time faculty, and 57% of classes having between 10 and 19 students. The college offers degrees in business, communication, education, environmental studies, human development and family studies, liberal arts, psychology, criminal justice, and sports and fitness.

Performing Arts 

The Performing arts department consists of a dance and cheer team, select choir assemble, and a drama society. The department puts on 2 concerts per academic year for the choir which is free of charge. The dance and cheer team preforms at various campus events and has at least 2 showcases per year. Lastly the drama society puts on 2 performances per academic year.

Notable alumni and faculty
 Alvin Young (basketball player)
 Rita Williams (basketball player)
 Dan Mara (coach) 
 Charlie Kadupski (soccer player)
 Derrick Levasseur (TV personality)
 John Ellis (baseball player)
 Christopher Annino (filmmaker)
 Edward Belbruno (mathematician)

References

External links
 
 Official athletics website

 
Buildings and structures in New London, Connecticut
Private universities and colleges in Connecticut
Educational institutions established in 1938
Universities and colleges in New London County, Connecticut
Liberal arts colleges in Connecticut
1938 establishments in Connecticut